The Delaware AeroSpace Education Foundation (DASEF) is a 501(c)(3) non-profit organization dedicated to promoting aerospace education in the State of Delaware. DASEF educates students of all ages in the areas of math, science, technology, and aerospace through the use of academies, presentations, symposia, professional development, and the Innovation Technology Exploration Center (ITEC).

History 
DASEF was founded in 1989 by its President and CEO Dr. Stephanie M.G. Wright.  DASEF first began with Destination Orbit, and quickly expanded to its current 8 academies.  Originally, Destinations Orbit, Moon, and Mars were named as Level I, II, and III respectively.  In addition, Destinations Sky & Beyond and Space were half day academies.

Mission 
The DASEF mission is 
DASEF's programs are supported by many partners that include Delaware's institutions of higher learning, Delaware Space Grant Consortium, Delaware Air National Guard, Dover Air Force Base, Department of Transportation, Delaware Parks and Recreation, corporate sponsors, and the Civil Air Patrol.

Innovation Technology Exploration Center 
The  ITEC site in northern Kent County is located in Smyrna, Delaware, shared with Big Oak County Park.  Construction began in 2003 in four phases. The Environmental Outpost was completed first. It hosts Mountjoy observatory, the second-largest telescope in the State of Delaware.  Currently, the rest of ITEC is still under construction.  The building is LEED certified through its implementation of solar panels and other energy efficient technologies. ITEC hosts the bi-annual Family Day for the public to enjoy.

Programs 
DASEF hosts programs open to the public for the Delaware valley citizens. Most notably, the Delaware Aerospace Academy, Launching a Dream, and Rockets for Delaware programs instruct the general public with a great appreciation of aeronautics.

Delaware Aerospace Academy 
The Delaware Aerospace Academy (DAA) is a week-long academy for students entering 1st through 10th grade. The academy comprises eight full-day and overnight programs, called "Destinations," held at the Environmental Outpost or the University of Delaware. Programs are staggered from late-June to mid-July. Destinations Ocean and Dinosaur, the newest programs, are day camps held at the Environmental Outpost in [Smyrma, Delaware]. Destinations Sky & Beyond, Space, Flight and Orbit are day camps held in June at the University of Delaware. Destinations Moon and Mars, overnight camps at the University of Delaware, present older cadets with additional challenges regarding aerospace topics. Similar to those in the military, all students are called "cadets." Each academy is structured with four wings, composed of 10 cadets per wing.

Common activities include trips to Dover Air Force Base and launching model rockets.

Launching a Dream 

Launching a Dream is an annual program for elementary school students to learn about space.  Most notably, this program features a converted school bus into a mock Space Shuttle orbiter vehicle.  The vehicle has realistic tail and wings that extend for student simulation and retract for transportation on public highways.

Rockets for Delaware 

Rockets for Delaware is an annual May model rocket launch at Cape Henlopen State Park. Rockets range from water rockets to model rockets to high-power rocketry.

References

External links 
DASEF webpage
Delaware Aerospace Academy
Rockets for Delaware

Buildings and structures in Kent County, Delaware
Charities based in Delaware
Education in Delaware
Nature centers in Delaware
Tourist attractions in Kent County, Delaware